Marc Trauner (born April 7, 1969) better known by his numerous aliases including Marc Acardipane, Mescalinum United, The Mover, Pilldriver, Marshall Masters and Resident E, is a DJ and producer based in Frankfurt, Germany.

History 
Trauner was co-founder of record label Planet Core Productions and the hardcore techno production team with the same name, better known as PCP. He released, as Mescalinum United, "We Have Arrived" in 1990. "We Have Arrived" was remixed by Aphex Twin and two versions of the track appeared on Aphex Twin's album Classics.

He scored a top 20 hit in the UK in collaboration with Scooter in 2003, with the single "Maria (I Like It Loud)", a cover of his 1997 single "I Like It Loud" (Marshall Masters feat. The Ultimate MC).

In 2006 he released his Best Of Album - Best Of Marc Acardipane (1989-1998). This was spread over 2 volumes.

"We Have Arrived"
"We Have Arrived" is a hardcore techno track by Marc Trauner under the alias Mescalinum United. It was first released by Planet Core Productions in 1990 on the Reflections of 2017 EP. The track is often regarded as the first hardcore techno track.

Remixes
The Advent remix (5:35)
Aphex Twin QQT remix (4:24)
Aphex Twin TTQ remix (5:03)
Darrien Kelly's 98 retake (4:18)
DJ Promo remix (6:19)
Lory D remix (4:24)
Manu le Malin remix (4:40)
Miro remix (5:05)
Rude Awakening remix (4:10)
The Horrorist remix (4:06)
The Mover remix

References

External links
 Marc Trauner's official homepage
 Information on discogs.org
 Article by music journalist Simon Reynolds, originally published in The Wire, July 1998.

German DJs
Musicians from Frankfurt
Living people
1969 births
Electronic dance music DJs